The 2010 South American Women's Football Championship was the sixth edition of the South American Women's Football Championship, and acted as a qualifier for the 2011 FIFA Women's World Cup and the 2012 Summer Olympics. The tournament was held in Ecuador from 4 November to 21 November 2010, after originally being scheduled for 28 October to 14 November 2010.

The top two teams from the final group, Brazil and Colombia, qualified for the 2011 Women's World Cup and the 2012 Summer Olympics. Additionally, the top 4 teams qualified for the 2011 Pan American Games.

Venues
Seven venues in seven cities were used.

Squads

Match officials
The following referees were named for the tournament:
 Estela Álvarez
 Sirley Cornejo
 Ana Karina Marques Valentim Alves
 Carolina González
 Adriana Correa
 Juana Delgado
 Norma González
 Silvia Reyes
 Gabriela Bandeira
 Yanina Mujica

First stage

Matches were played in Latacunga, Ambato and Riobamba (Group A) and Loja, Cuenca and Azogues (Group B).

The tournament features a first round, where the ten teams are divided into two groups of five teams each. The top two teams in the groups advance to a final round, instead of a knockout stage.

The final round was set up in a round-robin format, where each team played one match against each of the other teams within the group. The top two teams in the group qualified for the 2011 FIFA Women's World Cup in Germany and the 2012 Olympic Games football tournament in London. The first-placed team won the tournament.

Three points were awarded for a win, one point for a draw, and zero points for a loss.

When teams finish level of points, the final order determined according to:
 superior goal difference in all matches
 greater number of goals scored in all group matches
 better result in matches between tied teams
 drawing of lots

Group A

Group B

Second stage

Brazil won the tournament and qualified for the 2011 FIFA Women's World Cup and the 2012 Olympic Games tournament along with runners-up Colombia.

Awards

Statistics

Goalscorers
9 goals
 Marta
8 goals
 Cristiane
5 goals
 Yoreli Rincón
4 goals
 Gloria Villamayor
3 goals

 Palmira Loayza
 Karen Araya
 Francisca Lara
 Mónica Quinteros

2 goals

 Andrea Ojeda
 Mercedes Pereyra
 Aline
 Grazielle
 Janeth Salgado
 Nataly Arias
 Katerin Castro
 Catalina Usme
 Ingrid Vidal
 Joshelyn Sánchez
 Dulce Quintana
 Lyana Chirinos
 Ysaura Viso

1 goal

 Estefanía Banini
 Gimena Blanco
 Eva Nadia González
 Roxana Benavídez
 Carla Padilla
 Renata Costa
 Daniele
 Érika
 Rosana
 Yanara Aedo
 Patricia Quezada
 Daniela Zamora
 Paola Domínguez
 Daniela Montoya
 Yuli Muñoz
 Andrea Peralta
 Carmen Rodallega
 Oriánica Velásquez
 Patricia Freire
 Valeria Palacios
 Ingrid Rodríguez
 Joana Galeano
 Angélica Vázquez
 Miryam Tristán
 Carolina Birizamberri
 Paula Viera
 Oriana Altuve
 Nayla Quintero
 Karla Torres

Final ranking

References

External links
Official regulations 
COPA AMERICA–ECUADOR 2010 – Boletín Técnico Nº 2 

2010 South American Women's Football Championship